The Fresh Talent – Working in Scotland Scheme (FTWiSS) was a UK immigration scheme which was launched to deal with problems of population decline and skill shortages in Scotland. It ended on 29 June 2008, when it was replaced by Tier 1 (Post Study Work).  FTWiSS allowed non-EEA nationals who successfully complete a relevant Scottish degree or postgraduate qualification to work or set up a business in the UK for 24 months without needing a Work Permit. The principle of the scheme, and of its successor, is to retain skilled and educated graduates as part of the UK labour force, who will switch into a longer-term work scheme such as the Work Permit scheme or Tier 1 (General), formerly the Highly Skilled Migrant Programme.

FTWiSS and the similar International Graduates Scheme was replaced on 30 June 2008 by a new 2-year scheme, Tier 1 (Post Study Work), as part of the UK's roll out of a points-based immigration system. Tir 1 (Post Study Work was itself abolished in March 2012.

See also
Immigration to the United Kingdom
TalentScotland

External links
 Fresh Talent: Working in Scotland Scheme

Immigration to Scotland